Musical Revue is a live album featuring Prince Far I and Suns of Arqa released on ROIR Europe in 1988. The album was produced by Phil Rainford and features a live recording of Prince Far I with Suns of Arqa at Band on the Wall in Manchester on 7 December 1982.

The sound is fairly rough with Suns of Arqa low in the mix and Prince Far I a little too close. There is much dub mixing, delays, reverbs, and repeats flying left and right, and the music appears improvised in places. The music here is more complex than reggae, sometimes moving towards variations on jazz/highlife (e.g. "Brujo Magic").

This album captured Prince Far I's last concert. He was murdered in Kingston, Jamaica in 1983.

Track listing
 "Steppin' To The Music" – 1:33
 "Throw Away Your Guns" – 10:15
 "Brujo Magic" – 6:15
 "Version Galore" – 5:36
 "83 Struggle" – 7:48
 "Trancedance Music" – 4:34
 "Foggy Road" – 4:56
 "What You Gonna Do On The Judgement Day" – 8:53

Personnel
Prince Far I - vocals
Helen Watson - vocals
Marcel King - lead vocals on "Version Galore", backing vocals
Snuff - drums
Dan Sheals - drums
Spliff - bass
Wayne "Worm" Sedgman - bass
Michael Wadada - rhythm guitar
Mustaphafakir - lead guitar
Anton Behrendt - keyboards
Tony Trundle - fiddle
Marek Miczyk - violin
Brian Jones - saxophone
Prince Hammer - MC
Keshav Sathe - tabla

References

1983 live albums
Suns of Arqa albums